Servant is an American psychological horror streaming television series created by Tony Basgallop and executive produced alongside M. Night Shyamalan, who serves as showrunner.

The series follows Dorothy and Sean Turner, a Philadelphia couple who hire eighteen-year-old Leanne Grayson to be the nanny for their infant son Jericho, a reborn doll. Leanne's arrival brings about strange and frightening occurrences for the couple.

The series stars Lauren Ambrose, Toby Kebbell, Nell Tiger Free and Rupert Grint as the four central characters. It is produced for Apple TV+ and debuted on November 28, 2019. The series has received critical acclaim. Ahead of the premiere, Apple renewed Servant for a second season, which premiered on January 15, 2021. In December 2020, ahead of the second season premiere, the series was renewed for a third season. The third season premiered on January 21, 2022. The fourth and final season premiered on January 13 and concluded on March 17, 2023.

Premise
A wealthy Philadelphia couple, Dorothy and Sean Turner, experience a fracture in their marriage after the death of their thirteen-week-old son, Jericho. The couple undergo transitory object therapy using a lifelike reborn doll after Dorothy experiences a full psychotic break. The doll, which Dorothy believes is her real child, was the only thing that brought her out of a catatonic state following Jericho's death. Six weeks after his death, they hire a young nanny, Leanne Grayson, to move in and take care of Jericho, the reborn doll, opening their home to a "mysterious force". While Sean deals with the grief on his own, he becomes deeply suspicious of Leanne.

Cast and characters

Main
 Lauren Ambrose as Dorothy Turner (née Pearce), a local television news reporter and highly overprotective mentally ill mother who accidentally killed her thirteen-week-old firstborn child by vehicular heatstroke. Upon finally remembering one year later, she is understandably horrified and inconsolable but comes to terms with it in the end and thanks her husband for never giving up on her. 
 Toby Kebbell as Sean Turner, Dorothy's husband and a stay-at-home consulting chef. 
 Nell Tiger Free as Leanne Grayson, a mysterious young nanny from Wisconsin hired by the Turners to look after "Baby Jericho". She seems to possess very powerful yet involuntary and uncontrollable supernatural abilities that develop gradually and grow stronger every night she stays at the Turners' house. Ever since being interviewed by Dorothy at a beauty pageant when she was nine, she has since then had a psychotic obsession with Dorothy; seeing the delusional woman as the loving and doting mother she never had. She ultimately sacrifices herself by burning down the Turner house and undergoing the ritual that cult had used against her many times beforehand. Her sacrifice saves the city of Philadelphia from the ever worsening rainstorm. 
 Rupert Grint as Julian Pearce, Dorothy's alcoholic younger brother who seemed to be aware of Leanne's ever-developing, strengthening supernatural influence and unspecified extrasensory and life-based abilities, which ultimately made him into an unwitting member of the Church of Lesser Saints cult.
 Mason and Julius Belford as Baby Jericho Turner (season 1) the firstborn child of the Turners who tragically died from overheat in his mother's car due to her carelessness just two months and a half after he was born on June 1, 2019. One month and a half later (six weeks in October), he was replaced by a lifelike reborn doll to soothe Dorothy under the delusion that her beloved young son is still alive. 
 Jack and James Hoogerwerff as Baby Jericho Turner (Seasons 2, 3, 4) the one-and-a-half-year-old firstborn child of Sean and Dorothy Turner who supposedly returns to life by Leanne's ever developing supernatural abilities. When his mother finally remembered, he reverted back to the lifelike reborn doll again, which had burned up along with the rest of the house and Leanne. According to Leanne, he has forgiven his mother for her error in his young life being taken so young.

Supporting
 Phillip James Brannon as Matthew Roscoe, Julian's private detective friend who becomes brainwashed by the Church of Lesser Saints cult. His fate is unknown by the finale "Fallen." 
 Tony Revolori as Tobe, Sean's commis chef who has a crush on Leanne. 
 Son as Wanda (Season 1), a babysitter whom Leanne befriends. 
 Boris McGiver as Uncle George, Leanne's "uncle" who ultimately is burned by Leanne doing the ritual on him. His charred corpse was left in the basement and was engulfed with the rest of the house. 
 Jerrika Hinton as Natalie Gorman (season 1–2), Dorothy's close friend and therapist who suggested the reborn doll as a temporary coping method.
 Molly Griggs as Isabelle Carrick (season 1–3), an up-and-coming reporter at 8News where Dorothy works.
 Todd Waring as Frank Pearce, Dorothy and Julian's father and maternal grandfather to Baby Jericho.
 Alison Elliott as May Markhem (season 1–2, 4), George's wife and Leanne's "aunt" and leader of the Church of Lesser Saints cult.
 Victoria Cartagena as Officer Stephanie Reyes (season 2, 4), a police officer who had come to the Turner House in middle-late August 2019 to ask a catatonic Dorothy about what she remembered about her son's death. She is ultimately revealed to be one of the Church of Lesser Saints who tells a skeptical Julian that he is now one of them now since being revived from his overdose by Leanne last Christmas. 
 Billy Vargus as Walker Roush (season 2–4), a news anchor for 8 News
 Katie Lee Hill as Kourtney (season 2–4), Frank's much-younger girlfriend who had helped Dorothy get the nurses Beverly and Roberta to help accelerate her recovery. 
 Sunita Mani as Vera (season 3), Julian's new girlfriend who ultimately left him when he revealed her troubled past to his elder sister, which led her to breakup with him. 
 Mathilde Dehaye as Snake (season 3-4), a homeless person in the park who left the Church of Lesser Saints cult to worship Leanne. 
 Joshua De Jesus as Milo (season 3), a homeless person in the park who follows Leanne, but went missing and is presumed killed by the Church of Lesser Saints. 
 Mac Rop as Lou (season 3-4), another homeless person in the park who left the Church of Lesser Saints cult to worship Leanne.
 Barbara Kingsley as Roberta "Bobbie" (season 4), Dorothy's sick-nurse who ultimately resigned. She is a spiritual medium who managed to hear what the spirits of Dorothy and Julian's alcoholic late mother, Mrs. Pearce, and even infant Jericho were saying to them.
 Denny Dillon as Beverly "Bev" (season 4), Dorothy's nurse who was revealed to be a member of the Church of Lesser Saints who supposedly died via snakebite but was due to Leanne's powerful supernatural abilities.

Guest
 M. Night Shyamalan as a Delivery Guy ("Reborn")
 Barbara Sukowa as Aunt Josephine, a member of the Church of Lesser Saints cult ("Goose" & "Josephine")
 Nadia Alexander as Sylvia, Tobe’s girlfriend and is looking for a job with Sean ("Ring")
 Carmen M. Herlihy as Nancy, Sean's minister from Liberty Unitarian ("Tiger" & "Fish")
 Frank Wood as Dr. Dale Mackenzie, Frank's old friend who works as a psychologist ("Commitment")

Episodes

Season 1 (2019–20)

Season 2 (2021)

Season 3 (2022)

Season 4 (2023)

Production

Development

On February 27, 2018, it was announced that Apple Inc. had given the production a series order for a first season consisting of ten episodes. The series was created by Tony Basgallop who also wrote for the series and executive produced it alongside M. Night Shyamalan, Ashwin Rajan, Jason Blumenthal, Todd Black, and Steve Tisch. Production companies involved with the show include Blinding Edge Pictures, Escape Artists, and Dolphin Black Productions. Mike Gioulakis served as the series' cinematographer. On October 3, 2019, it was reported that the series was scheduled to be released on November 28, 2019. Ahead of the series premiere, on November 22, 2019, it was announced that Apple had renewed the series for a second season which is set to premiere on January 15, 2021. On December 15, 2020, ahead of the second season premiere, Apple renewed the series for a third season. On December 14, 2021, ahead of the third season premiere, Apple renewed the series for a fourth and final season.

Shyamalan stated that he originally envisioned the series to stretch for 60 half-hour episodes, or six seasons, but he ultimately planned the show to be four seasons with 40 episodes in total.

Casting
On August 22, 2018, it was announced that Lauren Ambrose and Nell Tiger Free had been cast in leading roles. On November 30, 2018, it was reported that Rupert Grint had joined the main cast. On December 4, 2018, it was announced that Toby Kebbell had been cast in a starring role. in December 2021, Sunita Mani was announced to be joining the cast.

Filming
The first season of Servant was filmed in Philadelphia from November 2018 to March 2019. Exterior scenes took place in Philadelphia's Center City near Spruce and 21st Streets. A set for the interior of the Turner home was built in a former paint factory in Bethel Township, Delaware County, Pennsylvania. Italian chef Marc Vetri served as a food consultant for the cooking scenes in season one.

In March 2020, Apple TV+ shut down production of season two due to the COVID-19 pandemic. In September 2020, production resumed to finish the four remaining episodes of season two. Philadelphia chef Drew DiTomo was the food consultant for season two, spending many days making pizzas and teaching the cast to make the pizzas that served as the basis for Cheezus Crust, the fictional pizza delivery company that Sean and Dorothy created during the season.

In February 2021, it was reported that production on season three had begun.

In an interview with Backstage, Grint revealed that unlike many film and television productions, Servant is filmed chronologically, with the cast getting scripts as they film each episode, keeping them just as much a part of the mystery as the characters and viewers.

Apple reportedly asked Shyamalan not to display crucifixes on the walls during filming.

Release
The first season of Servant premiered on Apple TV+ on November 28, 2019, and ran for ten episodes until January 17, 2020. Ahead of the first season premiere, Apple renewed the show for a second ten-episode season, which premiered on January 15, 2021. In December 2020, ahead of the second season premiere, the series was renewed for a third season. The third season premiered on January 21, 2022. In December 2021, ahead of the third season premiere, the series was renewed for a fourth and final season. The fourth and final season premiered on January 13, 2023.

Marketing
Coinciding with the release of the second-season finale, and paying homage to Cheezus Crust—the fictional pizza business that Dorothy and Sean create in the season—Apple partnered with two pizza restaurants in Los Angeles to offer free pizza throughout the weekend.

Reception

Critical response

For the first season, the review-aggregation website Rotten Tomatoes reported an 84% approval rating with an average score of 7.2/10, based on 61 reviews. The website's critical consensus reads, "Though Servants slithering mystery often wanders into dark, crowded corners, its claustrophobic atmosphere and powerful performances build enough tension to keep viewers hooked." Metacritic, which uses a weighted average, assigned a score of 64 out of 100 for the season, based on reviews from 20 critics, indicating "generally favorable reviews".

For the second season, Rotten Tomatoes reported an 88% approval rating with an average score of 7.6/10, based on 26 reviews. The site's critical consensus reads, "Servants second season serves up a solid—if not always convincing—set of thrills with a better grasp on its dark humor." Metacritic assigned a score of 76 out of 100 based on nine critics, indicating "generally favorable reviews".

For the third season, Rotten Tomatoes reported a 92% approval rating with an average score of 6.7/10, based on 12 reviews. Metacritic assigned a score of 73 out of 100 based on four critics, indicating "generally favorable reviews".

For the fourth and final season, Rotten Tomatoes reported a 100% approval rating with an average score of 7.7/10, based on 15 reviews. The site's critical consensus reads, "Servants devotion to gothic absurdity pays off handsomely in a confident final season, with this singular series ending on a note of characteristically wry disquiet." Metacritic assigned a score of 82 out of 100 based on seven critics, indicating "universal acclaim".

Author Stephen King has praised the series on multiple occasions, calling it "spooky as hell", "extremely creepy and totally involving." Filmmaker Guillermo del Toro has called it a beautifully crafted, elegant show which feels like a European slow burn. He particularly praised the surgical staging and camera work in the M. Night Shyamalan-directed episodes, as well as Rupert Grint's performance.

Accolades

Lawsuit
In January 2020, Francesca Gregorini filed a lawsuit against Servant producers including Tony Basgallop and M. Night Shyamalan, the production companies involved, and Apple TV+, alleging copyright infringement for her 2013 drama film, The Truth About Emanuel. The Truth About Emanuel is a psychological thriller in which a woman uses a lifelike doll to cope with the loss of her infant, hiring a young girl as a nanny to take care of it. Basgallop and Shyamalan responded that neither had seen her film and that any similarity is coincidence. They go further in saying that Servant was in development before the creation of Gregorini's film.

On May 28, 2020, a federal judge threw out the copyright lawsuit against Shyamalan and Apple, ruling that the TV show is not similar enough to the film to merit a lawsuit. Gregorini responded that the, "ruling is disappointing, but not surprising", and that "the balance of power in the entertainment industry has always favored powerful men and institutions" after the suit was thrown out. On July 21, 2020, the court ordered Gregorini to pay the defendants' attorneys' fees of $162,467. The court emphasized the objective unreasonableness of her claims.

In February 2022, however, the United States Court of Appeals for the Ninth Circuit determined that the lawsuit was dismissed prematurely, as the discovery steps had not actually been carried out, ruling "'reasonable minds could differ' on whether the stories are substantially similar."

References

External links

2010s American drama television series
2010s American horror television series
2019 American television series debuts
2023 American television series endings
2020s American drama television series
2020s American horror television series
American horror fiction television series
Apple TV+ original programming
English-language television shows
Horror drama television series
Works by M. Night Shyamalan
Psychological thriller television series
Psychological horror
Television shows set in Philadelphia
Television shows filmed in Pennsylvania
Television productions suspended due to the COVID-19 pandemic